Quebec County may refer to:

 Quebec County (Province of Canada electoral district)
 Quebec County (electoral district), a former federal riding from 1867 to 1925
 an alternative name for Québec-Comté (provincial electoral district), a former provincial riding from 1867 to 1966
 County of Quebec, a former riding of Lower Canada, see Electoral districts of Lower Canada
 Quebec County, Quebec, a historic county in the province of Quebec